Blacklick Valley Junior Senior High School is a diminutive, rural, public high school located in Cambria County, Pennsylvania. In 2014 enrollment was 282 pupils in grades 7th through 12th inclusive. The school employed 26 teachers. Blacklick Valley Junior Senior High School is the sole high school operated by the Blacklick Valley School District.

High school students may choose to attend Admiral Peary Vocational-Technical School for training in the construction and mechanical trades. The Appalachia Intermediate Unit IU8 provides the District with a wide variety of services like specialized education for disabled students and hearing, speech and visual disability services; technology support and professional development for staff and faculty.

Extracurriculars
Blacklick Valley School District offers a wide variety of clubs, activities and an extensive, publicly funded sports program.

Athletics

The school provides:
Varsity

Boys
 Football - Class A
 Basketball - Class A
 Baseball - Class A
 Track and Field - Class AA

Girls
 Basketball - Class A
 Softball - Class A
 Track and Field - Class AA

Junior High Middle School Sports

Boys
Basketball
Football
Girls
Basketball

According to PIAA directory June 2015

References

Schools in Cambria County, Pennsylvania
1967 establishments in Pennsylvania
Public high schools in Pennsylvania